Web Services Interoperability Technology (WSIT) is an open-source project started by Sun Microsystems to develop the next-generation of Web service technologies. It provides interoperability between Java Web Services and Microsoft's Windows Communication Foundation (WCF).

It consists of Java programming language APIs that enable advanced WS-* features to be used in a way that is compatible with Microsoft's Windows Communication Foundation as used by .NET. The interoperability between different products is accomplished by implementing a number of Web Services specifications, like JAX-WS that provides interoperability between Java Web Services and Microsoft Windows Communication Foundation.

WSIT is currently under development as part of Eclipse Metro.

WSIT is a series of extensions to the basic SOAP protocol, and so uses JAX-WS and JAXB. It is not a new protocol such as the binary DCOM.

WSIT implements the WS-I specifications, including:
Metadata
WS-MetadataExchange
WS-Transfer
WS-Policy
Security
WS-Security
WS-SecureConversation
WS-Trust
WS-SecurityPolicy
Messaging
WS-ReliableMessaging
WS-RMPolicy
Transactions
WS-Coordination
WS-AtomicTransaction

See also 

 JAX-WS

References

External links 

Sun Developer Network's WSIT page
WS-I and WSIT - What's the difference?
 java.net project pages
WSIT java.net project page
GlassFish java.net project page
JAX-WS java.net project page
 WSIT documentation
 WSIT Tutorial
 WS-I information
 WS-I home page
 Specifications
WS-MetadataExchange
WS-Transfer
WS-Security
WS-SecureConversation
WS-SecurityPolicy
WS-Trust
WS-ReliableMessaging
WS-RMPolicy
WS-Coordination
WS-AtomicTransaction
WS-Policy
WS-PolicyAttachment

A general framework, applicable but not limited to Web services, for interoperation of model-based services is described at

Interoperability
Java enterprise platform
Web services